Apis mellifera intermissa is an African subspecies of the western honey bee.

Description
Previously classified as A. m.intermissa v. Buttel-Reepen a reviewed  classification of genus instead states the sub-species as A. m. intermissa v. Maa (M. S. Engel 1999) Found in the south of Spain  and the (Maghreb) north of the Sahara desert in Africa, ranging from the east (Libya) to the west (Morocco), and is adapted to dry climates.  This bee has a black-brown and orange striated abdomen and  black-brown thorax with orange fur.

Taxonomy
In a comparative study of five subspecies and A. m. iberica (Smith, Palopoli, Taylor, Garnery, Cornuet, Solignac, Brown 1991) cleavage maps obtained through the use of restriction enzymes
 showed that the Spanish honey bee contains mtDNA (mitochondrial DNA) similar to intermissa and also mellifera. Additionally, A. m. intermissa belongs to a group shown by experiment to have similar mtDNA, this including monticola, scuttelata, adansonii and capensis 

In Spanish honey bee populations, mtDNA haplotypes of African bee strains were found to be frequently present (Smith 1991, Garnery et al 1995) (Cornuet et al 1975, 1978, 1982, 1988; Ruttner 1988; Cornuet and Fresnaye 1989; Orante-Bermejos and Garcia-Fernandez 1995; Hepburn and Radloff 1996). Migrating honey bee populations formed the original colonies of honey bees in western Europe, landing to eventually populate the continent from Africa across the Straits of Gibraltar.

See also
List of Apis mellifera subspecies

References

External links

mellifera intermissa
Western honey bee breeds
Hymenoptera of Africa
Hymenoptera of Europe
Insects of North Africa